Diving board may refer to:

Springboard
Diving platform, referred to as a "tower" or sometimes "firm board"
The Diving Board, a 2013 album by Elton John